The International Gandhi Peace Prize, named after Mahatma Gandhi, is awarded annually by the Government of India.

As a tribute to the ideals espoused by Gandhi, the Government of India launched the International Gandhi Peace Prize in 1995 on the occasion of the 125th birth anniversary of Mohandas Gandhi. This is an annual award given to individuals and institutions for their contributions towards social, economic and political transformation through non-violence and other Gandhian methods. The award carries  in cash, convertible in any currency in the world, a plaque and a citation. It is open to all persons regardless of nationality, race, creed or gender.

A jury consisting of the Prime Minister of India, the Leader of the Opposition in the Lok Sabha, the Chief Justice of India, Speaker of the Lok Sabha and one other eminent person decides the awardee each year.

Ordinarily, only proposals coming from competent persons invited to nominate are considered. However, a proposal is not taken as invalid for consideration by the jury merely on the ground of not having emanated from competent persons. If it is considered that none of the proposals merit recognition, the jury is free to withhold the award for that year; the award was withheld in the years from 2006 to 2012 inclusive. Only achievements within 10 years immediately preceding the nomination are considered for the award; an older work may, however, be considered if its significance has not become apparent until recently. A written work, to be eligible for consideration, should have been published.

Recipients

See also 
 Gandhi Memorial International Foundation
 Gandhi Peace Award
 Indira Gandhi Peace Prize
 List of peace activists

References 

Peace awards
Indian awards
 
Gandhism
Memorials to Mahatma Gandhi